Stefanówka may refer to the following places:
Stefanówka, Łódź Voivodeship (central Poland)
Stefanówka, Opole Lubelskie County in Lublin Voivodeship (east Poland)
Stefanówka, Świdnik County in Lublin Voivodeship (east Poland)
Stefanówka, Masovian Voivodeship (east-central Poland)